Margaret Eileen Joyce Wheeler, Baroness Wheeler  (born 25 March 1949) is a British Labour member of the House of Lords who is an Opposition Whip.

In the 2005 Birthday Honours she was appointed a Member of the Order of the British Empire (MBE) for services to Trade Unions.

She was created a life peer on 20 June 2010 taking the title Baroness Wheeler, of Blackfriars in the City of London, and was introduced in the Lords on 14 July 2010.

Parliamentary career 

 Shadow Spokesperson for Health and Social Care (4 June 2018 - present)
 Opposition Deputy Chief Whip in House of Lords (31 January 2018 - present)
 Opposition Senior Whip in the House of Lords (1 April 2014 - present)
 Opposition Whip in the House of Lords (8 October 2010 - 1 April 2014)

References

External links 

 

1949 births
Labour Party (UK) life peers
Living people
Life peeresses created by Elizabeth II
Members of the Order of the British Empire